Barbara Marumoto is a former member of the Hawaii State House of Representatives. She represented Kaimuki, Waialae, and Kahala as a Republican.

Biography 
Marumoto was born in San Francisco, and spent part of her childhood in an internment camp.

Marumoto earned a bachelor's degree in sociology from the University of Hawaii. She also studied at the University of California, Berkeley, University of California, Los Angeles and San Francisco State University.

Marumoto was a delegate to the 1978 Hawaii Constitutional Convention. She served in the Hawaii House of Representatives since 1978.  She is a Republican, and served as the Hawaii House Minority leader from 1984–1986 and again from 1998–2000. She did not seek reelection in 2012. As a lawmaker, she was best known for supporting small businesses, children's safety, tax reduction, and fiscal reform. Marumoto was also active in many community organizations, such as the Honolulu Japanese Chamber of Commerce, the AARP, and the Historic Hawaii Foundation.

She is married to Richard A. Coons, a retired CPA.

References

Living people
University of Hawaiʻi at Mānoa alumni
University of California, Berkeley alumni
University of California, Los Angeles alumni
San Francisco State University alumni
Women state legislators in Hawaii
Hawaii politicians of Japanese descent
Republican Party members of the Hawaii House of Representatives
American women of Japanese descent in politics
Year of birth missing (living people)
21st-century American women
Asian conservatism in the United States